Brian R. Etting is an American producer, director, and screenwriter known for producing Broken, Funny or Die, A Good Old Fashioned Orgy, and Relative Strangers starring Danny DeVito. He also executive produced Drunk History: Douglass & Lincoln which won Best Short Film at the 2010 Sundance Film Festival.  Etting also owns his own production company with Josh Etting called Garlin Pictures.

Career
Etting told the Daily Bruin, “(The) most interesting filmmakers are the people that are really well-rounded, that have an education outside of the editing room, outside of the film classes and really study great writing and great authors and great stories. English, in retrospect, is the best thing I could have done. I developed great skills as a producer, was able to identify great material and then put all the elements together, which is the financing, and the director, and the talent, and understanding the foreign market well enough to mitigate risk and not lose your investments.”

Filmography

Producer / Other

Director / Writer

References

External links
 

Living people
Businesspeople from Los Angeles
21st-century American businesspeople
American male screenwriters
Year of birth missing (living people)
Place of birth missing (living people)
Film directors from Los Angeles
Screenwriters from California
21st-century American screenwriters
21st-century American male writers